The Oklahoma Office of Personnel Management (OPM) was an agency of the government of Oklahoma which was dissolved in 2011. OPM managed the civil service of the state government. OPM previously provided comprehensive human resource services to all state agencies and employees (excluding institutions of higher education), as well as information for individuals interested in state service careers. OPM, together with the Oklahoma Merit Protection Commission, was responsible for administering and enforcing the State Merit System.

The Office of Personnel Management was created as an independent agency in 1982 during the term of Governor George Nigh as the successor to the Merit System Office. OPM was consolidated into the Office of State Finance in 2011 during the term of Governor Mary Fallin.

Functions
The Office of Personnel Management, in partnership with the Oklahoma Merit Protection Commission, administers a variety of personnel-related management systems and services within state government to ensuring a professional and non-political civil service. In addition to administering the Merit System, the OPM provides a wide variety of personnel-related services and regulatory functions affecting all agencies and employees in all branches of state government. It is the responsibility of OPM to maintain a central clearing house of all classified job openings for the state government.

Classified and unclassified
OPM has total jurisdiction over state employees that are in the classified service and very limited jurisdiction over unclassified service employees. Classified employees are all state employees and positions which are subject to rules of OPM and the decisions of the Oklahoma Merit Protection Commission. This is as opposed to the unclassified service, which are at-will employees. The two primary distinctions between classified and unclassified employees are as follows:
unclassified employees serve at the pleasure of the appointing authority. They may be removed from their position at any time, with or without cause, and have no right to appeal their termination to the Commission.
unclassified employees are non-competitive positions. They are appointed by the appointing authority without regard to merit provisions, such as publicly publishing the position opening and rating eligible candidates.

Leadership
The Office is under the supervision of the Director of State Finance and subject to the direct executive control of the Administrator of the Office. The Administrator is appointed by the Director to serve at his pleasure. Prior to reforms enacted in 2011, the Administrator was appointed by and reported directly to the Governor of Oklahoma. The last Administrator appointed by a Governor was Oscar B. Jackson Jr., who served in that position from 1991 until his retirement in 2011 following the reforms.

Organization
Cabinet Secretary
Director of State Finance
Administrator
Deputy Administrator for Programs
State Employee Assistance Program Department
Employee Selection Services Department
Personnel Assessment Division
Applicant Services Division
Office of Equal Opportunity and Workforce Diversity
Human Resources Development Services Department
Agency Payroll Support Services Department
Management Services Department
Classification Division
Compensation Division
Office of Workforce Planning
Associate Administrator for Financial Management and Chief Financial Officer
Financial Management Services Department
General Counsel
Legal Affairs Department
Office of Legislative Affairs

Supporting agencies
Affirmative Action Review Council
Governor's Advisory Council on Asian American Affairs
Governor's Ethnic American Advisory Council
Employee Assistance Program Advisory Council
Committee for Incentive Awards for State Employees
Governor’s Advisory Council on Latin American and Hispanic Affairs
Mentor Selection Advisory Committee
Oversight Committee for State Employee Charitable Contributions

See also
Office of Personnel Management (Federal government)
Office of Management and Budget

Office of Personnel Management